Another Lonely Song is the twelfth studio album by American country music singer-songwriter Tammy Wynette. It was released on March 18, 1974, by Epic Records.

Commercial performance 
The album peaked at No. 8 on the Billboard Country Albums chart. The album's only single, "Another Lonely Song", peaked at No. 1 on the Billboard Country Singles chart.

Track listing

Personnel
Adapted from the album liner notes.
Bill Barnes - cover design
Lou Bradley - engineer
The Jordanaires - backing vocals
Cam Mullins - string arrangements
The Nashville Edition - backing vocals
Ron Reynolds - engineer
Billy Sherrill - producer
Bergen White - string arrangements
Tammy Wynette - lead vocals

Chart positions

Album

Singles

References

1974 albums
Tammy Wynette albums
Epic Records albums
Albums produced by Billy Sherrill